This is a list of awards and nominations received by the late American rapper and actor Tupac Shakur.

American Music Awards 
The American Music Awards is an annual American music awards show. 

|-
| 1994 
| rowspan="2" | Tupac Shakur
| Favorite Rap/Hip-Hop New Artist
| 
|-
| 1997
| Favorite Rap/Hip-Hop Artist
| 
|}

ASCAP Rhythm & Soul Music Awards 

|-12321 143
| 2005 
| Runnin' (Dying to Live)(featuring The Notorious B.I.G.)
| Top Soundtrack Song of the Year
| 
|}

ECHO Awards 
The ECHO Award is a German music award granted every year by the Deutsche Phono-Akademie, an association of recording companies.

|-
| 2002
| Himself  
| Best International Hip-Hop Act
|

Grammy Awards 
The Grammy Awards is an accolade by the National Academy of Recording Arts and Sciences of the United States to recognize outstanding achievements in the music industry. The annual awards ceremony features performances by prominent artists, and some of the awards of more popular interest are presented in a widely-viewed televised ceremony. Shakur has been nominated 6 times.

|-
| rowspan="2" | 1996
| "Dear Mama"
| Best Rap Solo Performance
| 
|-
| Me Against the World
| rowspan="2" |Best Rap Album
| 
|-
| rowspan="3" | 1997
| All Eyez on Me
| 
|-
| "How Do U Want It" (featuring K-Ci & JoJo)
| rowspan="2" | Best Rap Performance by a Duo or Group
| 
|-
| "California Love" (featuring Dr. Dre & Roger Troutman)
| 
|-
| 2000
| "Changes"
| Best Rap Solo Performance
| 
|}

MOBO Awards 
The MOBO Awards award in " Music of Black Origin", established in 1996 by Kanya King and Andy Ruffell. It is held annually in the United Kingdom to recognize artists of any ethnicity or nationality performing black music. Shakur was nominated and won for Best Video in 1996 for California Love.

|-
| 1996
| California Love
| Best Video
| 
|}

MTV Video Music Awards
The MTV Video Music Award or abbreviated as the VMA, is an award presented by the cable channel MTV to honor the best in music videos. Shakur has been nominated 4 times - first being in 1996 and lastly in 2003 - for Best Rap Video.

|-
| 1996
| "California Love"(featuring Dr. Dre and Roger Troutman)
| rowspan="2"| Best Rap Video
| 
|-
| rowspan="2"| 1999
| rowspan="2"| "Changes"
| 
|-
| Best Editing in a Video
| 
|-
| 2003
| "Thugz Mansion"(featuring [[nas
]])
| Best Rap Video
| 
|}

NAACP Image Award 
The NAACP Image Award is an accolade presented by the American National Association for the Advancement of Colored People to honor outstanding people of color in film, television, music, and literature. Shakur has been nominated only 1 time - the first being in 1994.

|-
| 1994
| Tupac Shakur in Poetic Justice
| Outstanding Actor in a Motion Picture
| 
|}

Rock & Roll Hall of Fame 
The Rock & Roll Hall of Fame is sometimes simply referred to as the Rock Hall, is a museum and hall of fame located in downtown Cleveland, Ohio, United States, on the shore of Lake Erie. The museum documents the history of rock music and the artists, producers, engineers, and other notable figures who have influenced its development. Shakur was selected as one of the inductees for the Rock & Roll Hall of Fame's Class of 2017 during his first year eligibility. He was officially inducted into the Rock & Roll Hall of Fame on April 7, 2017 making him the first solo rapper and the sixth hip hop artist to be inducted in the Hall of Fame 30 year history. 

|-
| 2017
| Tupac Shakur 
| Rock and Roll Hall of Fame 
| Inducted 
|}

Soul Train Awards 
The Soul Train Music Awards is an annual award show which honors the best in Black music and entertainment. Shakur has been nominated only three times, first in 1996- for Best Rap Album and in 1997- for R&B/Soul or Rap Album of the Year and Best R&B/Soul or Rap Music Video. He has won 2 awards out of 3 nominations.

|-
| 1996
| Me Against the World
| Best Rap Album
| 
|-
| rowspan="2" | 1997
| All Eyez on Me
| R&B/Soul or Rap Album of the Year
| 
|-
| "How Do You Want It" / "California Love"
| Best R&B/Soul or Rap Music Video
| 
|}

Source Awards 
The Source Awards is an annual award show created by The Source Magazine which honors both hip-hop and R&B performers for their contributions to hip-hop. Shakur has been nominated in 2003 for Single of the Year (Male Solo Artist).

|-
| 2003
| "Thugz Mansion"(Featuring Anthony Hamilton)
| Single of the Year (Male Solo Artist)
| 
|}

References

External links 

Awards
Shakur, Tupac